The XDTM Standard Association is a non-profit consortium of more than 300 companies and government entities formed to generate and manage standards related to Digital transaction management.

Purpose

Board members currently include C-level executives from Microsoft, FedEx, DocuSign, Intel, NBCUniversal, Brown-Forman, university officers from Purdue University, and executives from Stanford Children's Health.

The association intends to follow a similar model to the Payment Card Industry Data Security Standard, which plays an important role in facilitating the flow of credit and debit card transactions.

Membership
The organization also includes the former head of the National Institute of Standards and Technology, Arden Bement.

Activities
The group recently created a Technical Steering Committee to "define and advance requirements, and create the framework for an associated certification program to ensure open, secure digital transactions."

References

Non-profit organizations based in the United States